The uncertainty parameter U is introduced by the Minor Planet Center (MPC) to quantify the uncertainty of a perturbed orbital solution for a minor planet. The parameter is a logarithmic scale from 0 to 9 that measures the anticipated longitudinal uncertainty in the minor planet's mean anomaly after 10 years. The larger the number, the larger the uncertainty. The uncertainty parameter is also known as condition code in JPL's Small-Body Database Browser. The U value should not be used as a predictor for the uncertainty in the future motion of near-Earth objects.

Orbital uncertainty 

Orbital uncertainty is related to several parameters used in the orbit determination process including the number of observations (measurements), the time spanned by those observations (observation arc), the quality of the observations (e.g. radar vs. optical), and the geometry of the observations. Of these parameters, the time spanned by the observations generally has the greatest effect on the orbital uncertainty.

Occasionally, the Minor Planet Center substitutes a letter-code (‘D’, ‘E’, ‘F’) for the uncertainty parameter. 
{|
|- style="vertical-align: top;"
! D    
| Objects with a ‘D’ have only been observed for a single opposition, and have been assigned two (or more) different designations ("double").
|- style="vertical-align: top;"
! E
Objects with assumed eccentricities are generally considered lost if they have not recently been observed because their orbits are not well constrained.
|- style="vertical-align: top;"
! F
|Objects with an ‘F’ fall in both categories ‘D’ and ‘E’.
|}

Calculation 
The U parameter is calculated in two steps. First the in-orbit longitude runoff  in seconds of arc per decade is calculated, (i.e. the discrepancy between the observed and calculated position extrapolated over ten years):

with
{| 
|-
| || uncertainty in the perihelion time in days
|-
| || eccentricity of the determined orbit
|-
| || orbital period in years
|-
|  || uncertainty in the orbital period in days 
|-
|  || , Gaussian gravitational constant, converted to degrees
|}

Then, the obtained in-orbit longitude runoff is converted to the "uncertainty parameter" , which is an integer between 0 and 9. The calculated number can be less than 0 or more than 9, but in those cases either 0 or 9 is used instead.

For instance: As of 10 September 2016, Ceres technically has an uncertainty of around −2.6, but is instead displayed as the minimal 0.

648 000 is the number of arc seconds in a half circle, so a value greater than 9 would mean that we would have basically no idea where the object will be in 10 years.

References 
 

Orbits
Measurement